Dario Alberto Polverini (born 6 April 1987) is a former Italian footballer.

Biography
Born in Anzio, the Province of Rome, he started his career at A.S. Roma. After played at their Primavera Under-20 team in 2006–07 season, he left for Prato on loan.

On 25 July 2008, he was loaned to Pro Patria with option sign him in a co-ownership deal for €100,000, net of VAT. He only able to play 7 league matches.

On 12 August 2009, Pro Patria (with a new company structure) decided to sign him in a co-ownership deal for an undisclosed fee. In January 2010, he was loaned to Andria. In June 2010 Roma gave up the remain 50% registration rights.

In summer 2014 he was signed by Real Vicenza. On 17 July 2015 he was signed by Pisa.

On 31 January 2019 he joined Virtus Verona. Virtus contract was dissolved by mutual consent on 19 April 2019, and he retired from playing.

References

External links
 Profile at Andria 
 Profile at AIC.Football.it 
 
 

1987 births
Living people
People from Anzio
Italian footballers
A.S. Roma players
A.C. Prato players
Aurora Pro Patria 1919 players
S.S. Fidelis Andria 1928 players
Pisa S.C. players
Modena F.C. players
S.S. Racing Club Fondi players
A.S. Pro Piacenza 1919 players
Serie C players
Association football defenders
Footballers from Lazio
Sportspeople from the Metropolitan City of Rome Capital